The 1905 Latrobe Athletic Association season was their tenth season in existence. The team finished 8-0 and were unscored upon. As a result, Latrobe claimed the Pennsylvania professional football title.

Schedule

Game notes

References

Latrobe Athletic Association
Latrobe Athletic Association seasons